HomeStars.com is a Canadian company which publishes reviews written by homeowners about home improvement professionals such as repairman, contractors, renovators, and retailers.

HomeStars was formed in 2006 by Nancy Peterson. The Globe and Mail ran a feature on the company shortly after its foundation. The company began as an online community of homeowners, sharing reviews based on their personal experience to help other homeowners find reputable contractors. Each review can contain details on the delivery of the work, the contractor's work habits and the quality of the follow-up. Similar to other review sites such as TripAdvisor, contractors are able to respond to any reviews that are written about them.

The National Post announced in 2015 that HomeStars had over two million companies listed on its website and hundreds of thousands of consumer reviews about those contractors. In 2015, ProfitGuide ranked HomeStars as the 77th fastest growing company in Canada. Its founder and CEO, Nancy Peterson, won an award in 2015 as one of Canada's top female entrepreneurs, where she ranked in 71st position.

How It Works 
When a homeowner submits a service request, the HomeStars rotation system is activated. This system sends the homeowner three proposals from three different companies ready to provide the requested service. The homeowner then has the option to choose one of these three companies to hire based on their HomeStars profile, online portfolio, and customer ratings, among other factors.

Signing up on HomeStars as a homeowner is free, while professionals have two options: a base account that is free, and a premium account that the professional pays for on a monthly basis. Only professionals with a premium account are acknowledged by the HomeStars rotation system.

Reception
The reception of Homestars can best be described as "mixed", with many positive and negative reviews.

Negative Reception Of Homestars
Many reviewing sites have kept low ratings of Homestars. On Sitejabber it has an average rating of 2.1 stars, with user Justin M. describing it as  "Not too great for contractors". Other review sites such as Trustpilot has an average of 3.0 stars. These reviews are all either 5 star or 1 star reviews, showing that reviewers feel strongly about the company. One user, Manuel Romero encourages users to "Stay away from Homestars". He claims that Homestars scammed him and took advantage of his small business, and feels that Homestars's customer service is of bad quality.

There is a growing concern of the positive reviews of the website to have been fabricated. Many of the 5 stars reviews seem to have been copied and pasted, as they appear to be almost identical to one another and follow the same format.

Others share these concerns on the trustworthiness of Homestars. There are a large amount of disgruntled customers who feel that Homestars "Cherry-picks" the reviews that they want on their site. These views are echoed by Nova Freeman, who claims to have hired a contractor with critical acclaim, yet they failed to match Nova's expectations.

Positive Reception Of Homestars
Despite various negative reviews, the company has received praise for how it ensures its reviews are authentic. HomeStars detects fake reviews by a combination of a proprietary algorithm that detects suspicious activity and moderators who investigate reviews to ensure work was done. Once a negative review is published, some contractors may threaten legal action against the homeowner. If the homeowner decides to remove the review, it will be flagged as ‘removed by author’, which acts as a warning to others. Also, if HomeStars detects a contractor is attempting to post fake reviews or threaten homeowners, a suspicious activity flag will be posted prominently on their listing page.

There have been a number of lawsuits where contractors had attempted to file defamation lawsuits against homeowners who had written negative reviews about poor work. HomeStars helps people understand the difference between a negative review and a defamatory review. HomeStars was criticized for publishing a high rating on a contractor who then went bankrupt and left customers who had made large down-payments with unfinished work.

HomeStars was acquired by HomeAdvisors parent company IAC, in February 2017. HomeAdvisor offers similar services in the US, and the acquisition of HomeStars is part of HomeAdvisor's strategy "to build a dominant global business and brand" according to their press release.

References

Consumer guides
Review websites
Canadian companies established in 2006
Internet properties established in 2006
Companies based in Toronto
2006 establishments in Ontario